Craig Hill (born December 27, 1987) is an American soccer player who plays for Finnish club KTP, on loan, from Kultsu FC. He previously played for the San Antonio Scorpions, and for the USL Pro side River Plate Puerto Rico.

External links
 SMU bio

1987 births
Living people
Soccer players from San Antonio
American soccer players
Association football goalkeepers
SMU Mustangs men's soccer players
Austin Aztex U23 players
Club Atlético River Plate Puerto Rico players
San Antonio Scorpions players
FC Dallas draft picks
Kotkan Työväen Palloilijat players
USL League Two players
USL Championship players
North American Soccer League players
Veikkausliiga players
American expatriate soccer players
American expatriate sportspeople in Finland
Expatriate footballers in Finland
Kuopion Palloseura players
PEPO Lappeenranta players